"Bad Boys" is a song by English pop duo Wham! which was a hit in 1983. It was written and co-produced by George Michael, one half of the duo, and released on Innervision Records.

The song was an energetic but endearing tale of a rebellious teenage lad's struggle against his parents who are concerned about his late-night activities. Although George wrote and sang it from the teenager's perspective (he was himself only 19 when he composed it and the character refers to being that age in the song), he also penned a middle eight in which the "parents" (George putting on more "adult" voices) aired their concerns, which included late nights and cigarettes and ultimately asking, "Why do you have to be so cruel?". George's father was played by Anthony Souter who was 18 and made up to look older.

Chart performance
It was the third single to be taken from Wham!'s debut album, Fantastic, and reached number 2 in the UK Singles Chart, going on to become the 26th best selling single of 1983. At the time, Wham! was projecting a hard, politically motivated image, with "Bad Boys" one of a number of songs projecting a stance of mood and youthful independence, a "soul boy – dole boy" theme.  The single was also released in the United States, peaking at number 60. It was the duo's first time on the Billboard Hot 100 in the US, although they were listed as Wham!-UK.

"Bad Boys" became the biggest hit from the debut album, although it would be usurped by "Wake Me Up Before You Go-Go" from the album Make It Big in 1984, which became the first of four UK number-one singles the duo would enjoy. George quickly denounced "Bad Boys" as a song he hated, stating it was "like an albatross round my neck". The song was famously omitted from the 1997 compilation album The Best of Wham!: If You Were There..., despite the album including tracks that were not released as singles.

Track listing

Charts

Weekly charts

Year-end charts

Certifications

References

1982 songs
1983 singles
Wham! songs
Songs written by George Michael
Song recordings produced by George Michael
CBS Records singles
Innervision Records singles
Songs about teenagers